Jean Guillou was a French composer, organist, pianist, and pedagogue. Titular Organist at Saint Eustache from 1963 to 2015, he was known world wide as a composer of instrumental and vocal music focused on the organ, improviser, and adviser to organ builders. For several decades, he held regular master classes in Zurich and in Paris.

Organ solo
 Fantaisie, op. 1 (1952. Mainz: Schott, 2005)
 18 Variations, op. 3 (1956. Mainz: Schott, 2005)
 Sinfonietta, op. 4 (1958/revised in 2005. Mainz: Schott, 2005)
 Ballade Ossianique No. 1 ("Temora"), op. 8 (1962/1967 published by Leduc, Paris, as "Pour le tombeau de Colbert"/revised in 2005. Mainz: Schott, 2005)
 Toccata, op. 9 (1962/revised in 2004. Mainz: Schott, 2004)
 6 Sagas, op. 20 (1970. Mainz: Schott, 2005)
 Ballade Ossianique No. 2 ("Les Chants de Selma"), op. 23 (1971/published in 1971 by Leduc, Paris, as "Allen"/revised in 2005. Mainz: Schott, 2005)
 La Chapelle des Abîmes, op. 26 (1973. Mainz: Schott, 2005)
 Scènes d'enfants, op. 28 (1974. Mainz: Schott, 2005)
 Jeux d'Orgue, op. 34 (1978. Vienna: Universal Edition, 1984)
 Suite pour Rameau, op. 36 (1979. Boston, MA: Wayne Leupold Editions, 1994)
 Saga No. 7, op. 38 (1983. Vienna: Universal Edition, 1984)
 Sonate en trio No. 1, op. 40 (1984. Paris: Durand, 1985)
 Chamades!, op. 41 (1984. USA: H. T. FitzSimons, 1984)
 Impromptu, for pedal solo op. 42 (1985. Vienna: Universal Edition, 1988)
 Hypérion ou la Rhétorique du Feu, op. 45 (1988. Boston, MA: Wayne Leupold Editions, 1996)
 Säya ou l'Oiseau Bleu, op. 50 (1993. Mainz: Schott, 2004)
 Éloge, op. 52 (1994. Boston, MA: Wayne Leupold Editions, 1995)
 Alice au pays de l'orgue for organ and narrator, op. 53 (1995. Mainz: Schott, 1998)
 Pensieri pour Jean Langlais, op. 54 (1995. USA: H. T. FitzSimons, 1996)
 Instants, op. 57 (1998. Mainz: Schott, 2015)
 Pièces furtives, op. 58 (1998. Mainz: Schott, 2000)
 Hymnus, op. 72 (in memoriam P. Japp Reuten) (2008. Mainz: Schott, 2009)
 Regard, op. 77 (2011. Mainz: Schott, 2013)
 Enfantines, op. 81 (2013. Mainz: Schott, 2015)
 Sonate en trio No. 2, op. 82 (2013. Mainz: Schott, 2014)
 Sonate en trio No. 3, op. 83 (2013. Mainz: Schott, 2014)
 Macbeth – Le lai de l'Ombre, op. 84 (2009. Mainz: Schott, 2016)
 Psyché, op. 87 (1978-2015. Unpublished.)
 Périple, op. 87 (2016. Unpublished.)
 Pensieri pour Claude Bernard, without Opus (Unpublished.)

Organ with other instruments
 Colloque No. 2 for Organ and Piano, op. 11 (1956-1964/revised in 2005. Mainz: Schott, 2005)
 Colloque No. 4 for organ, piano and two percussionists, op. 15 (1966/revised in 2006. Mainz: Schott, 2006)
 Intermezzo for Flute and Organ, op. 17 (1969. Mainz: Schott, 2008)
 Symphonie Initiatique, op. 18:
 Version for three organs (1969. Unpublished.)
 Version for two organs (1990. Unpublished.)
 Version for organ with two players (2009. Mainz: Schott, 2016)
 Colloque No. 5 for Organ and Piano, op. 19 (1969/revised in 2005. Mainz: Schott, 2005)
 Sonate for Trumpet or Violin and Organ, op. 25 (1972. Unpublished.)
 Concerto for Violin and Organ,  op. 37 (1982. Unpublished.)
 Colloque No. 6 for Organ and two Percussionists, op. 47 (1989. Unpublished.)
 Fantaisie concertante for Violoncello and Organ, op. 49 (1991. Mainz: Schott, 2009)
 Fête for Clarinet and Organ, op. 55 (1995. Mainz: Schott, 2008)
 Écho for Flute, Clarinet, String quintet, Choir, Piano and Organ, op. 60 (1999. Mainz: Schott)
 L’Ébauche d’un souffle (Concerto for Trumpet and Organ), op. 64 (1985. Mainz: Schott, 2016)
 Colloque No. 7 (Concerto for Piano and Organ), op. 66 (1998. Mainz: Schott, 2011)
 Colloque No. 8 for Marimba and Organ, op. 67 (2002. Mainz: Schott, 2008)
 La Révolte des Orgues for eight portative organs, great organ, and percussion, op. 69 (2005. Mainz: Schott, 2007)
 Colloque No. 9 for organ and pan flute, op. 71 (2008. Mainz: Schott, 2009)
 Répliques for Great Organ and Positive Organ, op. 75 (2009, Mainz: Schott, 2011)
 Colloque No. 10 for solo trumpet, seven trumpets, organ and percussion, op. 86 (2016, Mainz: Schott, 2017)

Organ and Orchestra
 Inventions (Organ concerto No. 1) for Organ and chamber orchestra, op. 7 (1960. Paris: Leduc, 1970)
 Concerto héroïque ( Organ concerto No. 2) for Organ and orchestra, op. 10 (1963/revised in 2005. Mainz: Schott, 2005)
 Organ Concerto No. 3 for Organ and string orchestra, op. 14 (1965. Paris: Leduc, 1972)
 Organ Concerto No. 4 for Organ and orchestra, op. 31 (1978. Unpublished.)
 Organ Concerto No. 5 ("Le Roi Arthur") for Organ and Brass quintet, op. 35 (1979/revised in 2010. Mainz: Schott, 2012)
 Concerto 2000 for Organ and large orchestra, op. 62, (2000. Mainz: Schott)
 Organ Concerto No. 6 for Organ and large orchestra, op. 68 (2002. Mainz: Schott)
 Organ Concerto No. 7 for Organ and orchestra, op. 70 (2006. Mainz: Schott, 2007)

Orchestra
 Triptyque for string orchestra, without opus (Paris: Leduc, 1965)
 Le Jugement Dernier: Oratorio for choir, soloists, organ and orchestra (1965. Paris: Leduc, 1966)
 Piano Concerto No. 1 for Piano and orchestra, op. 16 (1969. Paris: Leduc)
 Judith-Symphonie for Mezzo-soprano and orchestra (Symphonie No. 1), op. 21 (1970. Mainz: Schott)
 Symphony No. 2 for string orchestra, op. 27 (1974. Mainz: Schott, 2005)
 Symphony No. 3 ("La Foule") for large orchestra and two guitars, op. 30  (1977. Unpublished.)
 Concerto grosso for Orchestra, op. 32 (1978/revised in 2008. Mainz: Schott)
 Piano Concerto No. 2 for Piano and orchestra, op. 44 (1986. Mainz: Schott)
 Trombone Concerto for Trombone solo, 4 trumpets, 3 trombones, 3 tubas and two percussionists, op. 48 (1990. Mainz: Schott)
 Fantaisie concertante for Violoncello and Orchestra, op. 49 (1991/revised in 2015. Mainz: Schott, 2016)
 Fête for Clarinet and orchestra, op. 55 (1995. Mainz: Schott)

Chamber music
 Sonata Barocca for piano, oboe and flute, without opus (1944. Unpublished.)
 Colloque No. 1 for Flute, oboe, violin and piano, op. 2 (1956. Mainz: Schott, 2005)
 Cantilia for Piano, Harp, Timpani and 4 Celli, op. 6 (1960. Paris, Leduc, 1968)
 Colloque No. 3  for Oboe, Harp, Celesta, Percussion, 4 Celli and 2 double Basses, op. 12 (1964. Paris: Leduc, 1968)
 Quatuor for Oboe and string quartet, op. 22 (1971. Schott 2016)
 Cantiliana for Flute (or violin) and piano, op. 24 (1972. Mainz: Schott 2014)
 Poème de la Main for Lyric soprano and piano, op. 29 (1975. Mainz: Schott, 2016)
 Trio for 3 Violoncelli (excerpt from Diderot à corps perdu), op. 59 (1999. Unpublished.)
 Co-incidence for Violin solo, op. 63 (2001. Mainz: Schott, 2010)
 Epitases, op. 65:
 Version for pedal piano (Double Piano Borgato) (2002. Unpublished.)
 Version for two pianos (2002. Mainz: Schott, 2013)
 Chronique for Percussion Trio, op. 73 (2009. Unpublished.)
 Impulso for Flute solo, op. 74 (2009. Mainz: Schott, 2015)
 Poème for 4 hands Piano and Percussion, op. 78 (2012. Mainz: Schott, 2014)
 Main menue for Mezzo-Soprano and Piano, op. 80 (2012. Unpublished.)

Piano solo
 Première Sonate, op. 5 (1958. Paris: Amphion, 1974)
 Toccata, op. 9b (arranged for piano solo) (1962. Mainz: Schott, 2005)
 Deuxième Sonate, op. 33 (1978. Unpublished.)
 Deux Pièces: Nocturne et Impromptu, op. 56 (1967. Mainz: Schott, 2015)
 Augure, op. 61 (1999. Mainz: Schott, 2005)
 Valse oubliée, op. 79 (2012. Mainz: Schott, 2012)
 Troisième Sonate, op. 88 (2014–2018. Unpublished.)
 Variations, without opus (Unpublished.)

Vocal works
 L'Infinito for Bass and Organ, op. 13 (1965. Mainz: Schott, 2005)
 Andromède for Soprano and Organ, op. 39 (1984, rev. 1990. Mainz: Schott, 2007)
 Peace for mixed Choir (8 voices) and Organ, op. 43 (1985. Mainz: Schott, 2012)
 Aube for mixed Choir (12 voices) and Organ, op. 46 (1988. Mainz: Schott, 2016)
 Missa Interrupta for Soprano, Organ, Brass quintet, Percussion and Choir, op. 51 (1995. Mainz: Schott)
 Echo for mixed choir and small orchestra (1999. Mainz: Schott)
 Ihr Himmel, Luft und Wind for 8 voices Choir, op. 76 (2010, Mainz: Schott, 2010)
 Stabat Mater for Organ, Soli and Orchestra, op. 85 (1985-2015. Unpublished.)

Various Works
 Diderot à corps perdu (1978. Unpublished.)
 Cadenzas for concertos by Handel, C. Ph. E. Bach, Mozart, Widor (Mainz: Schott, 2017)
 Pièces brèves pour l’émission "Échappée par le ciel" (Unpublished.)
 Cadenza for Chromatic Fantasia and Fugue BWV 903 by J. S. Bach (Unpublished.)

Transcriptions for organ 
 Johann Sebastian Bach: Musical Offering BWV 1079 (Transcription from 1952. Mainz: Schott, 2005)
 Johann Sebastian Bach: Goldberg Variations BWV 988 (Unpublished)
 Johann Sebastian Bach: Sarabande from Partita for lute – BWV 997 (Unpublished)
 Johann Sebastian Bach: Badinerie from the orchestra suite no. 2 BWV 1067 (Unpublished)
 George Frideric Handel: Alla Hornpipe from "Water Music" (Mainz: Schott, 2014)
 Franz Liszt: Fantaisie et fugue sur le nom de BACH (syncretic version from 1977) (Mainz: Schott, 2005)
 Franz Liszt: Orpheus (Transcription from 1976. Mainz: Schott, 2005)
 Franz Liszt: Prometheus  (Mainz: Schott, 2008)
 Franz Liszt: Valse oubliée No. 1 (Mainz: Schott, 2007)
 Franz Liszt: Psalm XIII (Mainz: Schott, 2009)
 Franz Liszt: Tasso  (Mainz: Schott, 2012)
 Wolfgang Amadeus Mozart: Adagio and Fugue  in C minor K. 546 (Paris: Éditions Musicales Amphion)
 Wolfgang Amadeus Mozart: Adagio and Rondo in C minor K. 617 (Paris: Éditions Musicales Amphion)
 Modest Mussorgsky: Pictures at an Exhibition (Transcription from 1988. Mainz: Schott, 2005)
 Sergei Prokofiev: March from the opera "The Love for three oranges" (Bonn: Robert Forberg)
 Sergei Prokofiev: Toccata op. 11 (Bonn: Robert Forberg)
 Sergei Rachmaninoff: Symphonic Dances op. 45 – Version for two organs and for four hands and feet (Mainz: Schott, 2015)
 Igor Stravinsky: Three dances from "Petrouchka" (Transcription from 1968. Unpublished.)
 Pyotr Ilyich Tchaikovsky: "Scherzo" from Symphony No. 6 ("Pathétique") (Mainz: Schott, 2006)
 Pyotr Ilyich Tchaikovsky: Dance of the Sugar Plum Fairy from the Nutcracker Suite (Mainz: Schott, 2014)
 Giuseppe Verdi: "Quattro Pezzi Sacri: Te Deum and Stabat Mater"
 Antonio Vivaldi: Concerto in D major (Paris: Éditions Musicales Amphion)
 Antonio Vivaldi: Concerto in D minor (Mainz: Schott, 2014)

References

Bibliography
 Abbing, Jörg. Jean Guillou – Colloques – Biografie und Texte. St. Augustin, Germany: Dr. Josef Butz Musikverlag, 2006. .
 L'ORGUE n° 281: numéro spécial sur Jean Guillou, sous la direction de Sylviane Falcinelli, 2008.
 Cantagrel, Gilles. "Jean Guillou", in Guide de la musique d’orgue, edited by Gilles Cantagrel. Paris: Fayard, (1991) 2012, pp. 514–520.
 Cook, Mary Jean. "Errata in the published organ works of Jean Guillou", in The Diapason 67 (May 1967): 4–5.
 Hodant, Jean-Philippe. Rhétorique et Dramaturgie dans l'œuvre musicale de Jean Guillou Paris, France: Université Sorbonne, 1993.
 Orengia, Jean-Louis. Jean Guillou, interprète, compositeur et improvisateur. Mémoire de maîtrise de musicologie. Paris: Sorbonne, 1981/1982.
 Rhodes, Cherry. "Introducing Jean Guillou", in The A.G.O.R.C.C.O. Magazine (March 1974): 29 and 53.
 Terry, Mickey Thomas. "An Interview with Jean Guillou" in The American Organist 28, No. 4 (April 1994): 56–59.
 VV.AA. '"Regards". Hommages à Jean Guillou – Augure éditions, Paris 2014.

External links
 

Lists of compositions by composer